The following is a list of mayors of the city of Bosconia, Colombia.



See also

List of Governors of the Cesar Department

Notes

External links
 Bosconia official website

Politics of Bosconia
Politics of Colombian municipalities
Mayors, Bosconia